Coleophora unicrenata is a moth of the family Coleophoridae. It is found in Mongolia.

References

unicrenata
Moths of Asia
Moths described in 1975